Elite Hall, at 98 W. Main St. in Hyrum, Utah, is a historic dance hall that was built in 1917 that is listed on the National Register of Historic Places.  In 2003, when it was listed, it was deemed significant for association with community life in Hyrum and as one of only two surviving spring-loaded dance floors in Utah.  It has an "imposing presence" on the Main Street of Hyrum, and is mainly commercial-style but has elements of Prairie School styling in its design.

It was listed on the National Register of Historic Places in 2003.

References

Event venues on the National Register of Historic Places in Utah
Buildings and structures completed in 1917
Buildings and structures in Cache County, Utah
National Register of Historic Places in Cache County, Utah